Hyperectenus is a genus of beetles in the family Carabidae, containing the following species:

 Hyperectenus aenigmaticus Alluaud, 1935
 Hyperectenus minor Britton, 1946

References

Pterostichinae